KEAT may refer to:

 Pangborn Memorial Airport (ICAO code KEAT)
 KEAT-LP, a defunct low-power television station (channel 22) formerly licensed to Amarillo, Texas, United States

See also
 Keat, a surname